The 1934 Arizona Wildcats football team represented the University of Arizona in the Border Conference during the 1934 college football season.  In their second season under head coach Tex Oliver, the Wildcats compiled a 7–2–1 record (2–1–1 against Border opponents), finished in third place in the conference, and outscored their opponents, 138 to 54. The team captain was Bud Robinson.  The team played its home games at Arizona Stadium in Tucson, Arizona.

Schedule

References

Arizona
Arizona Wildcats football seasons
Arizona Wildcats football